Junaid Akbar (born 23 March 1977) is a Pakistani politician who had been a member of the National Assembly of Pakistan, from August 2018 till January 2023. Previously, he was a member of the National Assembly from June 2013 to May 2018. Junaid Akbar is one of the founding members of Pakistan Tehreek-e-Insaf. He has luminous services for the party in various capacities including that of Provincial Joint Secretary of Khyber Pakhtunkhwa.

Early life
He was born on 26 October.

Political career

Akbar was elected to the National Assembly of Pakistan as a candidate of Pakistan Tehreek-e-Insaf (PTI) from Constituency NA-35 (Malakand Protected Area) in 2013 Pakistani general election. He received 51,312 votes and defeated a candidate of Jamiat Ulema-e Islam (F).

He was re-elected to the National Assembly as a candidate of PTI from Constituency NA-8 (Malakand Protected Area) in 2018 Pakistani general election. He received 81,310 votes and defeated Bilawal Bhutto Zardari, the chairman of the Pakistan Peoples Party.

References

Living people
Pakistan Tehreek-e-Insaf politicians
Pakistani MNAs 2013–2018
1977 births
Pakistani MNAs 2018–2023